Llanos el Salado is a large endorheic basin of central Mexico. It is located on the Mexican Plateau, and covers portions of several Mexican states, including eastern and northeastern Zacatecas, Northern San Luis Potosí, western Tamaulipas, southwestern Nuevo León, and southeastern Coahuila. El Salado blends into the Bolsón de Mapimí, another endorheic basin, on the north. The basin has an arid climate and is covered by deserts and xeric shrublands.

Mexico's National Institute of Statistics and Geography (INEGI) divides the Llanos el Salado region into several basins:
 Fresnillo-Yesca
 Matehuala
 Presa San José-Los Pilares y Otras
 San Pablo y Otras
 Sierra Madre
 Sierra Madre Oriental
 Sierra de Rodriguez

References
 Olson, D., Dinerstein, E., Canevari, P., Davidson, I., Castro, G., Morisset, V., Abell, R., and Toledo, E.; eds. (1998). Freshwater biodiversity of Latin America and the Caribbean: A conservation assessment. Biodiversity Support Program, Washington DC.

Drainage basins of Mexico
Endorheic basins of North America
Mexican Plateau
Ecoregions of Mexico
Freshwater ecoregions
Landforms of Coahuila
Landforms of Nuevo León
Landforms of San Luis Potosí
Landforms of Tamaulipas
Landforms of Zacatecas
Natural history of the Mexican Plateau
Nearctic ecoregions